A clover detector is a gamma-ray detector that consists of 4 coaxial N-type high purity germanium (Ge) crystals each machined to shape and mounted in a common cryostat to form a structure resembling a four-leaf clover.

Operation
A gamma ray may interact with a single Ge crystal and deposit its full energy. The resulting charge collected will then be proportional to this energy. However, through the process of Compton scattering, a gamma ray may interact with two (or possibly more) crystals resulting in the energy (and thus the liberated charge) being shared by the crystals. In this case, a process known as add-back, where the charge collected by each of the crystals is summed, can be used to determine the energy of the incident gamma ray.

Advantages
There are a number of advantages offered by using clover detectors as opposed to the more conventional single crystal germanium detectors. Large volume high purity single crystals of Ge can be expensive. By mounting four smaller crystals in a common cryostat a detector of a given volume can be created at a reduced cost. In addition, the individual smaller Ge crystals present a smaller solid angle than a large volume Ge detector thus significantly reducing the effects of Doppler broadening on the resulting spectra. A clover detector can also be used to determine the electric or magnetic nature of the incident photons  (e.g. if the gamma ray is an electric quadrupole or a magnetic dipole) as the Compton scattering process for these two types of radiation is different.

References

External links
 CLover Array for Radioactive ION beams

Spectrometers
Particle detectors